Nama Karoo is a xeric shrubland ecoregion located on the central plateau of South Africa and Namibia. It occupies most of the interior of the western half of South Africa and extends into the southern interior of Namibia.

Climate 
The climate tends to be volatile and very harsh. Droughts are frequent with rain primarily falling in the summer. Rainfall is known to be highly seasonal, peaking between December and March. It tends to decrease from the east to west and from north to south. The variability in the inter-annual rainfall also tends to increase with increasing aridity. Mean maximum temperatures in the mid-summer (January) exceeds , while mean minimum mid-winter (July) temperatures are below freezing.

See also

References

External links
 World Wildlife Fund Page on Nama Karoo
 Nama Karoo Biome Page

Afrotropical ecoregions
Deserts and xeric shrublands
Ecoregions of Namibia
Ecoregions of South Africa
Geography of South Africa
Karoo